Deanwell is a suburb in south-western Hamilton in New Zealand. It is named after Deanwell Properties, the developers who subdivided the area. It was defined as a suburb of Hamilton in 1974.

Demographics

Deanwell had a population of 2,139 at the 2018 New Zealand census, an increase of 141 people (7.1%) since the 2013 census, and an increase of 135 people (6.7%) since the 2006 census. There were 669 households, comprising 1,029 males and 1,110 females, giving a sex ratio of 0.93 males per female. The median age was 29.5 years (compared with 37.4 years nationally), with 597 people (27.9%) aged under 15 years, 489 (22.9%) aged 15 to 29, 855 (40.0%) aged 30 to 64, and 192 (9.0%) aged 65 or older.

Ethnicities were 55.3% European/Pākehā, 31.8% Māori, 6.3% Pacific peoples, 20.6% Asian, and 3.4% other ethnicities. People may identify with more than one ethnicity.

The percentage of people born overseas was 25.5, compared with 27.1% nationally.

Although some people chose not to answer the census's question about religious affiliation, 45.6% had no religion, 34.1% were Christian, 1.3% had Māori religious beliefs, 6.5% were Hindu, 1.5% were Muslim, 2.0% were Buddhist and 2.1% had other religions.

Of those at least 15 years old, 276 (17.9%) people had a bachelor's or higher degree, and 309 (20.0%) people had no formal qualifications. The median income was $29,100, compared with $31,800 nationally. 135 people (8.8%) earned over $70,000 compared to 17.2% nationally. The employment status of those at least 15 was that 792 (51.4%) people were employed full-time, 204 (13.2%) were part-time, and 72 (4.7%) were unemployed.

Education
The school opened in 1973.

All these schools are co-educational.

See also 
 List of streets in Hamilton
Suburbs of Hamilton, New Zealand

References

Suburbs of Hamilton, New Zealand